

Track listing
"Rent Man / Resident Area" - Black Uhuru / Jah Grundy  – 7:18
"Heavy Manners" - Prince Far-I  – 3:16
"Rockers" - Glen Washington  – 2:34
"Rockers Dub" - Joe Gibbs and The Professionals  – 2:45
"Navel String" - Dennis Walks  – 3:14
"Band Yu Belly" - The Ethiopian  – 3:10
"Maga Dog" (Version Two) - Peter Tosh  – 2:44
"Money In My Pocket / Cool Running" - Dennis Brown/Prince Mohammed  – 7:47
"Natty Pass Him GCE" - Shorty The President  – 3:28
"A Win Them" - Leo Graham  – 4:01
"Heart And Soul" - Junior Byles  – 3:01
"Burn Babylon" - Sylford Walker  – 6:40
"Ghetto Living" - The Mighty Diamonds  – 3:37
"In A Jah Children" - Dhaima  – 4:09
"Things Not So Nice" - Ronald & Karl  – 3:01
"Dem A Pyaka" - Culture  – 3:40
"Ram It" - Kojak and Liza  – 3:32

Personnel
Lloyd Parks – bass
Robert Shakespeare - bass
George Fullwood – bass
Sly Dunbar – drums
Mikey "Boo" Richards – drums
Leroy "Horsemouth" Wallace – drums
Neville Grant – drums
Carlton Barrett – drums 
Willie Lindo – guitar
Winston "Bopeep" Bowen – guitar
Valentine "Tony" Chin – guitar
Earl "Chinna" Smith – guitar
Winston Wright – keyboards
Franklyn "Bubbler" Waul – keyboards
Harold Butler – keyboards – keyboards
Errol "Tarzan" Nelson – keyboards
Keith Sterling – keyboards
Gladstone Anderson – keyboards
Dean Fraser - saxophone
Ronald "Nambo" Robinson - trombone
Herman Marquis – saxophone
Vincent Gordon - trombone
Tommy McCook - horns
Bobby Ellis - trumpet
Uziah "Sticky" Thompson – percussion
Ruddy Thomas – percussion

1992 compilation albums
Reggae compilation albums